Better Off Without You may refer to
	
"Better Off Without You", 1990 song by Emmylou Harris from Brand New Dance
"Better Off Without You", song by Lonnie Gordon, written by Stock, Aitken, Waterman from If I Have to Stand Alone, covered by Hazell Dean
"Better Off Without You", song by Pittsburgh band The Clarks from Let It Go
"Better Off Without You", song by Tesla from Twisted Wires & the Acoustic Sessions
"Better Off Without You", instrumental by jazz guitarist Terje Rypdal from Odyssey
"Better Off Without You", 2020 song by Becky Hill & Shift K3Y